USS Almax II (SP-268) was a motorboat acquired by the U.S. Navy during World War I. She was outfitted with light guns and assigned patrol duty in the Chesapeake Bay area. Post-war she served with the U.S. Coast and Geodetic Survey before being sold in 1920.

Construction

Almax II (SP-268) -- a motorboat constructed in 1912 at Salisbury, Maryland, by the Salisbury Marine Construction Co. -- was acquired by the U.S. Navy on 18 May 1917 from Mr. Jacob Mayer of Baltimore, Maryland, and commissioned on 18 May 1917. [The Baltimore Sun - 17 Dec 1915 - Page 11]

World War I service 
 
Assigned to the section patrol, Almax II cruised the waters of the 5th Naval District through the end of World War I. She served with Squadron 2 and operated primarily between Newport News and Norfolk, Virginia.

Post-war service 

After the war, the boat continued to serve until 28 March 1919 when she was transferred to the Department of Commerce for use by the United States Coast and Geodetic Survey. Almax II was returned to Navy custody on 21 February 1920.

Final decommissioning 
She was sold on 14 July 1920; and, presumably, her name was struck from the Navy list at that time.

References 
 
 Almax II (American Motor Boat, 1912). Served as USS Almax II (SP-268) in 1917-1919

World War I patrol vessels of the United States
Motorboats of the United States Navy
Ships built in Salisbury, Maryland
Patrol vessels of the United States Navy
1912 ships